Bir Salim was a Palestinian Arab village in the Ramle Subdistrict of Mandatory Palestine. It was depopulated during the 1947–48 Civil War in Mandatory Palestine on May 9, 1948, by the Givati Brigade. It was located 4 km west of Ramla.

History
In the 1945 statistics, the village had a population of 410 Muslims, while the total land area was 3,401  dunams, according to an official land and population survey.

1948, aftermath
Netzer Sereni was established on village land in 1948.

See also
Schneller Orphanage

References

Bibliography

External links
Welcome To Bir Salim
 Bir Salim,  Zochrot
Survey of Western Palestine, Map 13: IAA,  Wikimedia commons
 Bir Salim,  from the Khalil Sakakini Cultural Center

Arab villages depopulated during the 1948 Arab–Israeli War
District of Ramla